Rabbi Moshe Chalava,  was a prominent 14th century Rabbi. He is also known as Maharam Chalava.

Biography
Rabbi Moshe Chalava was born circa 1290 in Barcelona. Having first studied under the Rashba, he continued learning under the latter's son, R' Yehuda, after the Rashba's passing in 1310. He was the Rabbi of Tortosa, in Spain, for 30 years. During this time, many Halakhic questions from all parts of Spain were addressed to him. These responsa were in manuscript form until 1987, when they were published for the first time.

The Maharam Chalava died circa 1370, at the age of 80.

Works

The Maharam Chalava wrote a commentary on the whole Talmud; only his commentary on Tractate Pesahim is extant. It was published for the first time in 1873. This commentary often focuses on elucidating Rashi and introduces novel and innovative approaches to the text.
A collection of responsum known as Responsa of Maharam Chalava.

https://www.scribd.com/doc/31200594/Untitled

https://books.google.com/books?id=3mvL6tUMIA0C&lpg=PA61&ots=9qMC4ZHhEA&dq=moses%20halava&pg=PA61#v=onepage&q=%20halava&f=false

References

1290 births
1370 deaths
People from Barcelona
Spanish rabbis